Flint City Bucks is an American soccer team based in Flint, Michigan, United States. Founded in 1995, the team plays in USL League Two.

The club was founded in 1995 as the Mid-Michigan Bucks, playing in Saginaw, and began playing in 1996. In 2004, the club changed its name to the Michigan Bucks following a move to Plymouth. In 2008, they moved to Pontiac. In 2019, they moved to Flint and changed their name to the current Flint City Bucks.

Starting in 2019, they began playing their home matches at Atwood Stadium. From 2008 through 2018, the team played its home matches at the soccer-specific Ultimate Soccer Arenas, one of the few teams to play regularly on a full-size indoor soccer field.

Throughout their existence, the Bucks have been one of the most successful minor league soccer teams in the United States, qualifying for eleven U.S. Open Cups, winning eleven divisional championships, and four national titles—the first team to reach that mark in USL League Two. In 2000 the Bucks became the first Premier Development League (PDL) team to defeat an MLS team in the US Open Cup when they beat the New England Revolution at Foxboro Stadium. They won their first PDL Championship in 2006, defeating the Laredo Heat 2–1. They defeated the Kitsap Pumas 1–0 at Ultimate Soccer Arenas to win the 2014 PDL Championship. In 2016, they defeated the Calgary Foothills FC 3–2.

On April 8, 2006, the Bucks became an official minor league affiliate of Major League Soccer's (MLS) Columbus Crew, and announced a partnership which allows Bucks players to go on training stints with the Crew, as well as having the MLS side annually come to the Detroit area to play a friendly with their sister team.

On August 3, 2019, the Flint City Bucks defeated Reading United AC for their fourth National Championship in their inaugural season at Flint's historic Atwood Stadium.

History
The Bucks organization entered the competitive soccer landscape in 1996, competing in the USISL Premier League. Almost immediately, the Mid-Michigan Bucks were a competitive outfit. They finished third in the Central Northern division in their debut year, making it all the way to the final Premier Six tournament, and despite being beaten by the San Francisco Bay Seals and eventual national champions Central Coast Roadrunners, they nevertheless set themselves up to be a force to be reckoned with in years to come.

The Bucks won their first divisional title in 1997, eight points clear of second place Detroit Dynamite with 12 wins on the season, and made it all the way to the national semi-finals, beating Grand Rapids Explosion, Kalamazoo Kingdom and Des Moines Menace before eventually falling 2–0 to the Central Coast Roadrunners in the final four. The Bucks also made their debut in the US Open Cup this year, enjoying an exciting 3–2 victory over USISL D3 Pro League side Wilmington Hammerheads, before losing to the A-League's Rochester Ragin' Rhinos in the second round. At the end of the season, Steve Burns was named PDSL Coach of the Year.

The Bucks finished second to perennial rivals Detroit Dynamite in 1998 off the back of an 11–5–1 record, and again made the regional finals, losing 3–2 to finalists Jackson Chargers after victories over Indiana Invaders and the Dynamite in the divisional playoffs. The Bucks were growing into formidable opponents, and cemented this reputation by winning the Great Lakes division of the newly renamed PDL in 1999, reaching the third round of the US Open Cup (eventually losing to MLS powerhouse Tampa Bay Mutiny after knocking off the Austin Lone Stars and Minnesota Thunder in earlier rounds), although the playoffs were a slight disappointment by the Bucks' high standards, losing 2–1 to Sioux City Breeze in the Conference Semifinals.

The Bucks took their second PDL Great Lakes title in a row – their third overall – in 2000, annihilating their divisional opponents, and finishing an astonishing 27 points clear of second-place Dayton Gems. The Bucks got a bye to the national playoff semi-finals, and secured their first ever championship game berth with a 5–2 win over Yakima Reds. Unfortunately, the Bucks were beaten in the final by the Chicago Sockers, and had to be content with being the second best PDL team in the nation; still, three divisional titles and five consecutive trips to the playoffs was a remarkable achievement for the club. The Bucks also made it to the third round of the US Open Cup in 2000 – after a comfortable 3–0 win over Maryland-based amateur side Jerry D's, the Bucks knocked out Major League Soccer giants New England Revolution 1–0, with Chad Schomaker scoring the winning goal in the 90th minute, before losing their next game on penalty kicks to Miami Fusion after a 3–3 draw in regulation time. Unsurprisingly, head coach Joe Malachino was named PDL coach of the year, the second Bucks coach to receive the honor.

The Bucks missed the playoffs for the first time in 2001, beaten into third place in the Great Lakes Division by Chicago Fire Reserves and West Michigan Edge, but did manage to progress to the second round of the US Open Cup for the third year in a row, knocking out amateur side Chaldean Arsenal before New England Revolution got their revenge for the previous year, hammering them 7–1. The Bucks were beaten into second place again in 2002, pipped by the Chicago Fire Reserves for a second time, although they did progress to the Conference Final, where they lost on penalties to eventual national runners-up Boulder Rapids Reserve. Two years without a single trophy was unprecedented in Michigan, and things needed to change.

In 2003 there was a coaching change, as former San Jose Clash star Dario Brose was replaced by Don Gemmell. Gemmell's influence was felt immediately. The Bucks began the year with a five-game unbeaten streak that included an impressive 3–1 win on the road against Indiana Invaders, and continued on through the month of June with five wins in six games, highlighted by a 5–0 demolition of West Michigan Edge that featured a hat trick from Simon Omekanda. The Bucks secured their fourth divisional title off the back of two more comprehensive victories – 5–0 over Kalamazoo Kingdom and 4–0 over Fort Wayne Fever – but fell in the conference final game to their perennial rivals, Chicago Fire Reserves. The Bucks continued on with their US Open Cup exploits, beating USL Pro Select League Long Island Rough Riders, before losing 4–0 to the New York/New Jersey Metrostars in Round 3.

In 2004, the Mid-Michigan Bucks became the Michigan Bucks, coinciding with their permanent move from Saginaw to metro-Detroit and a new logo.  The season began as 2003 had ended – with the Bucks on top. They opened the season with two five-goal victories over Indiana Invaders and West Michigan Edge, and went on to lose only three regular season games all year. The Bucks were deadly in front of goal: in addition to their 10-goal haul in the first two games, they put six past Indiana Invaders on Independence Day, and then scored 15 goals in three games, sweeping aside Fort Wayne Fever, Cleveland Internationals and West Michigan Edge with ease. Unfortunately, the Bucks' trip to the playoffs ended with an ignominious 3–2 defeat to Boulder Rapids Reserve in the first game. Knox Cameron was the Bucks' most prolific striker, scoring 15 goals for the season (including 2 hat tricks), while Joseph Kabwe, Simon Omekanda, Kevin Taylor and Mychal Turpin all notched impressive goal scoring figures.

Bucks stalwart Paul Snape, who had played for the team for many years, was appointed head coach in 2005, but the first few games of his tenure were rocky: three consecutive wins were followed by an unprecedented four-game winless streak, the nadir of which was a 4–1 loss on the road at Chicago Fire Premier. However, this was merely a blip on the radar, as the Bucks finally turned things around. From mid June to the end of the season, they rattled off ten consecutive wins. They beat the hapless Fort Wayne Fever 7–0, and annihilated poor Toledo Slayers in their three games, outscoring them 17–0, with Kheli Dube scoring four goals in one game, and with the final game being abandoned at half-time with the Bucks leading 6–0. Dube and Ryan McMahen were unstoppable in front of goal, netting 18 times between them on the way to the playoffs, while Kevin Taylor was named PDL Defender of the Year. Yet again, however, the Bucks stuttered in the playoffs, this time losing the Conference final to eventual national champions Des Moines Menace.

2006 was a landmark year for the Bucks. Dan Fitzgerald replaced Paul Snape as head coach, but the new man at the helm didn't destabilize the team. Four wins in their opening four games took the Bucks back to the US Open Cup after a 2-year break, and once again they upset higher-league opponents, beating Pittsburgh Riverhounds 2–0 in round 1, and overcoming Cincinnati Kings in Round 2, before eventually going down 4–1 to Major League Soccer's Columbus Crew in the third round. The Bucks did suffer a slight stutter in form, losing three of four games including a surprising 0–3 turnaround away at the Indiana Invaders, but regrouped for the final push to the playoffs and enjoyed a four-game unbeaten run at the end of the season (including a 6–1 hammering of West Michigan Edge in the final regular season match). After so many years of being so close, everything finally came right for the Bucks in the playoffs. They wiped out Colorado Rapids U23's 4–1 in the semi-finals, enjoyed sweet revenge over Chicago Fire Premier to take the Conference title 4–0, with Nate Jafta scoring a hat trick, and finally reached their first ever PDL Championship game by overcoming Western Conference champions Orange County Blue Star with two goals from Kenny Uzoigwe. On a hot, windy night in southern Texas, in front of 7,000 fans, and live on Fox Soccer, the Bucks beat Laredo Heat 2–1 with goals from Kenny Uzoigwe and Ty Shipalane to take their first ever national championship, after 11 years of play.

As reigning PDL champions, the Bucks started 2007 with high expectations, and to their credit they did not disappoint – if anything, they actually improved on their 2006 form. They began the season with an 11-game unbeaten run, with only three draws. Their majestic form took the Bucks to the US Open Cup once more, but for once they failed to beat their higher-division opponents, losing 4–2 to Richmond Kickers in first round. After a slight blip when they lost 2–1 to Cleveland Internationals after receiving two red cards, normal service was resumed with a 7–1 hammering of West Michigan Edge in the next game (which featured a Kenny Uzoigwe hat trick), and the Bucks strolled to their sixth divisional title. After dominating the St. Louis Lions in the playoff semi-final, the Bucks retained their Conference title with a comfortable 3–0 win over Chicago Fire Premier, returning to the national stage for a second consecutive year. A penalty shootout victory over Brooklyn Knights after a 1–1 tie in the semi-finals sent the Bucks to the Championship game for the second consecutive year – where, once again, their opponents were Southern Conference champions Laredo Heat. Over 6,500 fans in Laredo, Texas watched the game finish 0–0 after extra time; the resulting penalty shootout was full of drama when, with the scores balanced at 3–3, striker Kenny Uzoigwe suffered leg cramps and was unable to take his spot kick, and had to be substituted during the shootout. His replacement, Ian Daniel, had his kick saved by Laredo goalkeeper Ryan Cooper; teenager Felix Garcia then scored the winner for the Texans. Nevertheless, two consecutive trips to the championship game was a massive achievement for the Bucks, and cemented their place as one of the leading amateur clubs in the nation.

Prior to the 2008 season the Bucks moved into the brand new $17-million Ultimate Soccer Arenas in Pontiac, Michigan, making them one of the few teams to play regularly on a full-size indoor soccer field. Prior to this, the Bucks were without a regular home field for several years, and played games at numerous different venues in Michigan.

The Bucks continued their dominance of the Great Lakes division in 2008 with an almost flawless season. They lost just one regular season game all year, 1–0 at home to Toronto Lynx, but were unstoppable elsewhere, invariably crushing their opponents with a combination of free scoring and solid defence. Among the highlights were a 5–0 battering of Fort Wayne Fever in mid-May, a 4–2 win over divisional rivals Cleveland Internationals in early June, a 3–1 road victory over newcomers Kalamazoo Outrage, and a 3–0 win over Toronto Lynx – avenging their earlier defeat – on the final day of the season. Their solid early-season form also gave them a berth in the US Open Cup for the third straight year, but fell in the first round against USL League 2 side Cleveland City Stars. The Bucks had the divisional title wrapped up long before the final weekend, eventually finishing 8 points clear of Cleveland in the standings; as such, they entered the playoffs as hot favorites to progress, especially as they were hosting the Central Conference tournament at home in Pontiac. However, they were shockingly dumped out at the first hurdle by Kalamazoo Outrage, who scored an 86th-minute equalizer to force extra time, and ended up winning 3–1. The prolific Kenny Uzoigwe was the Bucks' top scorer, with 10 goals, while his partner Nate Jafta contributed 9 assists.

The Bucks reached the fourth round of the 2012 Lamar Hunt U.S. Open Cup after defeating the MLS Chicago Fire in the third round in extra time. They lost to the USL Championship's Dayton Dutch Lions in the fourth round in another extra time thriller.

Logo history

Supporters
Prior to the Bucks' inaugural season in Flint, Michigan, a group of their supporters met at the Soggy Bottom Bar in Flint. At this meeting, they formed the River Rats. The River Rats have established their "curva" in section 11 of Atwood Stadium, also known as the Rats Nest.

On match days, the River Rats gather at Soggy Bottom Bar for a pre-game provocation before marching a half-mile through Carriage Town to the Atwood Stadium turnstiles.

The River Rats are a community-oriented independent supporter group that participate in LGBTQ+ advocacy, community service, and philanthropy. The River Rats are a member of the Independent Supporters Council.

Notable former players
This list comprises players who went on to play professional soccer after playing for the team in the Premier Development League, or those who previously played professionally before joining the team.

Year-by-year

History vs. Professional Teams in U.S. Open Cup
6/24/97 – First Round – Wilmington Hammerheads 2 vs. Mid Michigan Bucks 3; E.A. Laney High School in Wilmington, N.C.
7/8/97 – Second Round – Mid Michigan Bucks 2 vs. (Rochester Rhinos) 3; Hershey Park Stadium in Hersey, Penn.
6/8/99 – First Round – Mid Michigan Bucks 3 vs. Austin Lone Stars 2; White Pine Stadium in Saginaw, Mich.
6/23/99 – Second Round – Minnesota Thunder 1 vs. Mid Michigan Bucks 2; National Sports Center in Blaine, Minn.
7/12/99 – Third Round – Mid Michigan Bucks 1 vs. Tampa Bay Mutiny 2; White Pine Stadium in Saginaw, Mich.
6/14/00 – Second Round – New England Revolution 0 vs. Mid Michigan Bucks 1; Foxboro Stadium in Foxborough, Mass.
7/25/00 – Third Round – Mid Michigan Bucks 3 vs. Miami Fusion 3 (5–6 PKs); White Pine Stadium in Saginaw, Mich.
6/27/01 – Second Round – New England Revolution 7 vs. Mid Michigan Bucks 1; Foxboro Stadium in Foxborough, Mass.
6/25/03 – Second Round – Mid Michigan Bucks 2 vs. Long Island Rough Riders 1; Hurley Field in Berkley, Mich.
7/16/03 – Third Round – Mid Michigan Bucks 0 vs. MetroStars 4; Hurley Field in Berkley, Mich.
6/14/06 – First Round – Michigan Bucks 2 vs. Pittsburgh Riverhounds 0; Rochester Adams High School in Rochester, Mich.
6/28/06 – Second Round – Michigan Bucks 2 vs. Cincinnati Kings 1; Stoney Creek High School in Rochester Hills, Mich.
7/12/06 – Third Round – Michigan Bucks 1 vs. Columbus Crew 4; Stoney Creek High School in Rochester Hills, Mich.
6/12/07 – First Round – Richmond Kickers 4 vs. Michigan Bucks 2; University of Richmond Stadium in Richmond, Va.
6/10/08 – First Round – Michigan Bucks 1 vs Cleveland City Stars 2; Ultimate Soccer Arenas in Pontiac, Mich.
5/22/12 – Second Round – Pittsburgh Riverhounds 0 vs. Michigan Bucks 1; Highmark Stadium in Pittsburgh, Pa.
5/29/12 – Third Round – Michigan Bucks 3 vs. Chicago Fire S.C. 2 (AET); Ultimate Soccer Arenas in Pontiac, Mich.
6/5/12 – Fourth Round – Michigan Bucks 1 vs. Dayton Dutch Lions 1; Oakland University Soccer Field; Rochester, Mich.
5/19/15 – Second Round – Michigan Bucks 0 vs. Portland Timbers 2 2; Ultimate Soccer Arenas in Pontiac, Mich.
5/17/17 – Second Round – Michigan Bucks 1 vs. Indy Eleven 0; Ultimate Soccer Arenas in Pontiac, Mich.
5/30/17 – Third Round – Michigan Bucks 1 vs. St. Louis FC 2; Ultimate Soccer Arenas in Pontiac, Mich.

Honors

League
USL Premier Development League / USL League Two
Playoff Champions: 2006, 2014, 2016, 2019
Regular Season
Champions: 2000, 2008, 2012, 2015, 2016
Central Conference
Champions: 2000, 2006, 2007, 2014, 2016, 2019
Great Lakes Division
Champions: 1999, 2000, 2003, 2004, 2007, 2008, 2010, 2011, 2012, 2014, 2015, 2016, 2017
USISL Premier League
North Central Division
Champions: 1997
Hank Steinbrecher Cup
Champions: 2017, 2018, 2019, 2022

Head coaches
  Steve Burns (1996–1999)
  Joe Malachino (2000–2001)
  Dario Brose (2002)
  Don Gemmell (2003–2004)
  Paul Snape (2005)
  Dan Fitzgerald (2006–2009)
  Gary Parsons (2010–2013)
  Demir Muftari (2013–2017)
  Paul Thomas (2018)
  Demir Muftari (2019–present)

Stadiums
 Hurley Field; Berkley, Michigan 14 games (2003–2005)
 White Pine Stadium; Saginaw, Michigan 1 game (2003)
 Stadium at Plymouth-Canton High School; Canton, Michigan 4 games (2003)
 Stadium at Oakland University; Rochester, Michigan 4 games (2005)
 Stadium at Stoney Creek High School; Rochester Hills, Michigan (2006)
 Stadium at Athens High School; Troy, Michigan 1 game (2007)
 Independence Park; Canton, Michigan 4 games (2007–2011)
 Stadium at Andover High School; Bloomfield Hills, Michigan 1 game (2007)
 Stadium at Saline High School; Saline, Michigan 1 game (2007)
 Stadium at Lake Orion High School; Lake Orion, Michigan 5 games (2007–2008)
 Stadium at Rochester High School; Rochester Hills, Michigan 1 game (2007)
 Columbus Crew Stadium; Columbus, Ohio 1 game (2007)
 Ultimate Soccer Arenas; Pontiac, Michigan (2008–2018)
 Stadium at Walled Lake Central High School; Walled Lake, Michigan 1 game (2011)
 Atwood Stadium; Flint, Michigan (2019–present)

References

External links
 
Official PDL site

 
Association football clubs established in 1995
USL League Two teams
1995 establishments in Michigan
Sports in Oakland County, Michigan